Aerosonde Ltd, now part of Textron Systems Unmanned Systems, is an Australian-based developer and manufacturer of unmanned aerial vehicles, including the AAI Corporation Aerosonde series. The company has customers in Australia, Asia and North America who use its vehicles for reconnaissance and meteorological applications.

History
The Aerosonde platform, then the sole product of Insitu inc. gained prominence on 21 August 1998 when an Aerosonde "Laima" became the first unmanned aerial vehicle to cross the North Atlantic, covering a 3270 km route in a time of 26 hrs 45 min.

On 22 June 2006, Aerosonde Ltd was acquired by the AAI Corporation. AAI was acquired in 2007 by Textron.

Aircraft

References

External links
 Aerosonde Ltd home page

Aircraft manufacturers of Australia
Australian brands
Unmanned aerial vehicle manufacturers